Widgiewa is a small community in the central part of the Riverina in New South Wales, Australia.

Geography 

History 
The place name Widgiewa is derived from the local Aboriginal word meaning "What do you want?".

Widgiewa was a station on the Tocumwal railway line.  The station opened on 16 September 1884 and closed on 4 May 1975.

Widgiewa Post Office opened on 15 March 1912 and closed in 1970.

References

External links

 Widgiewa Rail Siding

Towns in the Riverina
Federation Council, New South Wales